This is a list of German television related events from 2012.

Events
10 February - Ivy Quainoo wins the first season of The Voice of Germany.
16 February - Roman Lob is selected to represent Germany at the 2012 Eurovision Song Contest with his song "Standing Still". He is selected to be the fifty-seventh German Eurovision entry during Unser Star für Baku held at the Brainpool Studios in Cologne.
28 April - Luca Hänni wins the ninth season of Deutschland sucht den Superstar.
23 May - Rhythmic gymnast Magdalena Brzeska and her partner Erich Klann win the fifth season of Let's Dance.
25 November - Mrs. Greenbird win the third season of X Factor.
14 December - Nick Howard wins the second season of The Voice of Germany.
16 December - 20-year-old singer and pianist Jean-Michel Aweh wins the sixth season of Das Supertalent.

Debuts

International
28 August -  2 Broke Girls (2011-2017) (ProSieben)
19 September -  Alcatraz (2012) (RTL Nitro)

BFBS
 Fleabag Monkeyface (2011-2012)

Television shows

1950s
Tagesschau (1952–present)

1960s
 heute (1963-present)

1970s
 heute-journal (1978-present)
 Tagesthemen (1978-present)

1980s
Wetten, dass..? (1981-2014)
Lindenstraße (1985–present)

1990s
Gute Zeiten, schlechte Zeiten (1992–present)
Unter uns (1994-present)
Verbotene Liebe (1995-2015)
Schloss Einstein (1998–present)
In aller Freundschaft (1998–present)
Wer wird Millionär? (1999-present)

2000s
Deutschland sucht den Superstar (2002–present)
Let's Dance (2006–present)
Das Supertalent (2007–present)

2010s
The Voice of Germany (2011–present)

Ending this year
X Factor (2010-2012)

Births

Deaths

See also 
2012 in Germany